Gaelic Athletic Association league may refer to:
National Football League
National Hurling League